The 2010–2011 Liga EBA season is the 17th edition of the Liga EBA. This is the fourth division of Spanish basketball. Four teams will be promoted to LEB Plata. The regular season (and all games before the final playoffs) started on 29 September 2010, and finished on 30 April 2011.

Format

Regular season
The 80 teams are divided in five groups by geographical criteria. Group A is also divided in two:
Group A-A: Cantabria, Basque Country, La Rioja and Castile and León (except CB Zamora).
Group A-B: Galicia, Asturias and CB Zamora.
Group B: Madrid, Castile-La Mancha and Canary Islands.
Group C: Catalonia and Aragón.
Group D: Andalusia and Extremadura.
Group E: Valencian Community, Region of Murcia and Balearic Islands.

Group A Second phase
The three best teams of groups A-A and A-B play a double leg play-off, and the winners qualify to the final play-off.

Final play-off
The three best teams of each group plus a fourth qualified decided with special criteria will play a double leg play-off. From these 16 teams, only four will be promoted to LEB Plata.

Results

Group A

Group A-A

Group A-B

Second round play-offs

The three winners will join the final promotion play-offs.

Group A final standings
After the regular season of the groups A-A and A-B, the team qualified in the same position play a double game play-off to determine their final position in the table.

Group B

Group C

Group D

Group E

Final playoffs
16 teams will join the Final play-offs. Four of them will promote to LEB Plata.

Semifinals will be played on 14-15 and 21–22 May.

1After the renounce of Turismo de Mérida, Córdoba 2016 accepted the invitation of the Federation to join the playoffs.  Before them, the berth was offered to MyN Puente Genil, but the club denied it.

Playoffs table

References

External links
Liga EBA in FEB.es (Spanish)
Competition rules (Spanish)

Liga EBA seasons
EBA